Wrestling was contested at the 2013 Summer Universiade from July 11 to 16 at the Ak Bars Wrestling Palace in Kazan, Russia.

Medal summary

Men's freestyle

Men's Greco-Roman

Women's freestyle

Medal table

References

External links
2013 Summer Universiade – Wrestling
Results book

Universiade
Wrestling
2013
Universiade